Otter Nelson River School is an elementary and high school located at Cross Lake, Manitoba, at the south end of the community. The school teaches grades 1 to 4 and grades 9 to 12 and has approximately 1000 students.

The school teaches Math, English, Science, Chemistry, Physics, Biology, Global Issues, Geography, and First Nation Languages and Studies. The school's sports include Basketball, Cross-country, Volleyball, Track and Field, Soccer, and Wrestling.

Darts Multiplex
A Darts Multiplex has been under construction in Cross Lake ever since their ambitious run to the MHSAA Darts Final Four in 2011. The facility is expected to be completed by early 2014.

References

External links 
 http://www.clea.mb.ca/

Elementary schools in Manitoba
High schools in Manitoba
Educational institutions in Canada with year of establishment missing